The 2018 Canterbury-Bankstown Bulldogs season was the 84th in the club's history. Coached by Dean Pay, they finished the National Rugby League's 2018 Telstra Premiership in 12th place  and did not qualify for the finals.

Player movements

Signings
Clay Priest from  Canberra Raiders
Fa'amanu Brown from  Cronulla-Sutherland Sharks
Kieran Foran from  New Zealand Warriors
Aaron Woods from  Wests Tigers

Transfers/Leaving
James Graham to  St. George Illawarra Dragons
Sam Kasiano to  Melbourne Storm
Josh Reynolds to  Wests Tigers

Fixtures

Trial Matches

Regular season

Ladder

See also
 List of Canterbury-Bankstown Bulldogs seasons

References

Canterbury-Bankstown Bulldogs seasons
Canterbury-Bankstown Bulldogs season